Malich-e Bozorg (also Romanized as Malīch-e Bozorg, Meleych Bozorg, and Meleych-e Bozorg; also known as Malaché Yek and Malīch) is a village in Mosharrahat Rural District, in the Central District of Ahvaz County, Khuzestan Province, Iran. At the 2006 census, its population was 133, in 24 families.

References 

Populated places in Ahvaz County